Richard Darío Franco Acosta Escobar  (born 16 July 1992) is a Paraguayan footballer who plays as a defensive midfielder for Náutico.

Career

General Caballero

Sol de América

Avaí (loan)

CSA
On 30 December 2019 CSA signed Franco for the 2020 season.

Career statistics

Club

References

External links

1992 births
Living people
People from Alto Paraná Department
Association football midfielders
Paraguayan footballers
Paraguayan Primera División players
Club Sol de América footballers
Campeonato Brasileiro Série A players
Campeonato Brasileiro Série B players
Avaí FC players
Centro Sportivo Alagoano players
Clube Náutico Capibaribe players
Paraguay international footballers
Paraguayan expatriate footballers
Paraguayan expatriate sportspeople in Brazil
Expatriate footballers in Brazil